Ryan Harris may refer to:

 Ryan Harris (American football) (born 1985), American football offensive tackle
 Ryan Harris (cricketer) (born 1979),  Australian cricketer